Durgada is a village in Maregaon tahsil, Yavatmal district, Maharashtra, India.

Demographics 
As of the census of 2011, there were 60 people residing in the village. The population density was 14 people per square kilometer (37/sq mi). There were 18 households within the village. Males constitute 45% of the population and females 55%. Durgada has an average literacy rate of 56.6%, significantly lower than the national average of 74%. Male literacy is at 26.6%, while female literacy is 30%. In Durgada, 11.6% of the population is age 6 or under.

References 

Villages in Yavatmal district